Stephen W. "Seve" Wilson (born ) is a retired United States Air Force four-star general, who last served as the 39th vice chief of staff of the Air Force. He previously served as the deputy commander of United States Strategic Command. Prior to that, he served as the commander of Air Force Global Strike Command, Barksdale Air Force Base, La. In his capacity as commander of Air Force Global Strike Command his responsibilities included organizing, training, equipping, and maintaining all United States ICBM and nuclear-capable bomber forces. Prior to his current assignment, Wilson served as Commander, Eighth Air Force. Wilson was the longest serving vice chief of staff in Air Force history. He had his retirement ceremony on November 13, 2020 and retired effective December 31, 2020.

Military career
Wilson received his commission from Texas A&M University in 1981. He has had multiple flying tours, and led bomber, intelligence, surveillance and reconnaissance, mobility, aeromedical evacuation, and airborne command and control operations supporting Iraqi Freedom, Enduring Freedom and Combined Joint Task Force-Horn of Africa. Wilson has also held numerous command positions, including the Joint Functional Component Commander for Global Strike, where he planned and executed strategic deterrence and global strike operations for United States Strategic Command. During this time, Wilson also commanded Task Force 204 which oversaw the Air Force's nuclear bomber and reconnaissance activities in support of United States Strategic Command.

Wilson is a command pilot with more than 4,500 flying hours and 680 combat hours.

Education
1977 Fort Hunt High School, Alexandria, VA
1981 Bachelor of Science, Aerospace Engineering, Texas A&M University, College Station, Texas
1985 Squadron Officer School, Maxwell AFB, Ala.
1989 Master of Science degree, Engineering Management, South Dakota School of Mines & Technology
1993 Air Command and Staff College, Maxwell AFB, Ala.
1997 U.S. Air Force Weapons School, Nellis AFB, Nev.
2000 Master's degree in strategic studies, Air War College, Maxwell AFB, Ala.
2005 Leadership for a Democratic Society, Federal Executive Institute, Charlottesville, Va.
2007 Joint Force Air Component Commander Course, Maxwell AFB, Ala.
2009 Joint Flag Officer Warfighting Course, Maxwell AFB, Ala.
2010 Leadership Decision Making Program, John F. Kennedy School of Government, Harvard University, Cambridge, Mass.
2013 Pinnacle Course, National Defense University, Fort Lesley J. McNair, Washington, D.C.

Assignments
1. June 1981 – May 1982, student, undergraduate pilot training, Laughlin AFB, Texas
2. May 1982 – September 1986, T-38 Instructor Pilot, evaluator pilot and flight commander, 86th Flying Training Squadron, Laughlin AFB, Texas
3. September 1986 – May 1987, B-1 Student, 338th Combat Training Squadron, Dyess AFB, Texas
4. May 1987 – July 1991, B-1 Instructor Pilot and Flight Commander, 77th Bomb Squadron, Ellsworth AFB, S.D.
5. July 1991 – July 1992, Chief of Weapons and Tactics, 28th Operations Support Squadron, Ellsworth AFB, S.D.
6. July 1992 – July 1993, Student, Air Command and Staff College, Maxwell AFB, Ala.
7. July 1993 – September 1995, Joint Staff Officer, Doctrine, Concepts and Initiatives Division, Plans and Policy (J5), Headquarters U.S. European Command, Stuttgart, Germany
8. September 1995 – June 1997, Chief of Safety, 28th Bomb Wing, later, operations officer, 37th Bomb Squadron, Ellsworth AFB, S.D.
9. June 1997 – June 1999, Commander, B-1 Division, and Instructor Pilot, Weapons Instructor Course, USAF Weapons School, Ellsworth AFB, S.D.
10. August 1999 – June 2000, Student, Air War College, Maxwell AFB, Ala. 
11. June 2000 – June 2002, Deputy Commander, 366th Operations Group, Mountain Home AFB, Idaho
12. July 2002 – March 2004, Commander, 608th Air Operations Group, Barksdale AFB, La.
13. March 2004 – June 2006, Commander, 14th Flying Training Wing, Columbus AFB, Miss.
14. June 2006 – July 2007, Deputy Director of Air, Space and Information Operations (A2/3), Headquarters Air Education and Training Command, Randolph AFB, Texas
15. July 2007 – July 2009, Deputy Commander, Canadian North American Aerospace Defense Region, Winnipeg, Manitoba, Canada
16. July 2009 – July 2010, Commander, 379th Air Expeditionary Wing, Southwest Asia
17. July 2010 – June 2011, Director for Joint Integration, Directorate of Operational Capability Requirements, Deputy Chief of Staff for Operations, Plans and Requirements, Headquarters U.S. Air Force, Washington, D.C.
18. June 2011 – October 2013, Commander, Eighth Air Force (Air Forces Strategic), Barksdale AFB, La., and Joint Functional Component Commander for Global Strike, U.S. Strategic Command, Offutt AFB, Neb.
19. October 2013 – July 2015, Commander, Air Force Global Strike Command, Barksdale AFB, La.
20. July 2015 – July 2016, Deputy Commander, U.S. Strategic Command, Offutt, AFB, Neb.
21. July 2016 – November 2020, Vice Chief of Staff of the U.S. Air Force, Washington, D.C.

Flight information
Rating: Command Pilot
Flight hours: More than 4,600, and 680 combat hours
Aircraft flown: T-37, T-38, B-1 and B-52

Awards and decorations

Effective dates of promotion

References

Texas A&M University alumni
United States Air Force generals
Recipients of the Defense Distinguished Service Medal
Recipients of the Air Force Distinguished Service Medal
Recipients of the Legion of Merit
Recipients of the Defense Superior Service Medal
Year of birth uncertain
20th-century births
Living people